"Function" is the third single from E-40's 16th studio album The Block Brochure: Welcome to the Soil 2. The song features fellow rappers YG, Iamsu! and Problem. The song is produced by Trend of the group League of Star 2012. The song was certified Gold by the RIAA on November 3, 2016.

Music video
The video was released on March 5, 2012 via E-40's account on YouTube. An audio of the song was also released to YouTube on January 14 and has over 4.5 million views.  Waka Flocka Flame, Kreayshawn, Roach Gigz,  Bobby Brackins, Philthy Rich, B-Legit, and DJ Amen make cameo appearances in the music video.

Critical reception
When reviewing for The Block Brochure: Welcome to the Soil 2, Allmusic stated that "Minimal bass and scrappy attitude turn "Function" into a five-star pusher anthem." RapReviews also gave the song a positive review by saying "The Trend produced song is all the way new school with YG, IAmSu and Problem. 40 still steals the show though."

Remixes
The official remix features Chris Brown, Young Jeezy, Problem, French Montana & Red Cafe. Rapper Tyga freestyled the song on his Well Done 3 mixtape.

Chart performance
On March 24, "Function" reached #62 on the U.S. Billboard Hot R&B/Hip-Hop Songs chart, before the album was released. "Function" has also peaked at #42 on the Billboard Rap chart. It debuted on the Billboard Bubbling Under Hot 100 Singles chart at #22 on May 13, 2012. It is E-40's first appearance on that chart since 2008's "Wake It Up", featuring Akon.

Charts

Certifications

References

2012 singles
E-40 songs
YG (rapper) songs
Iamsu! songs
EMI Records singles
2012 songs
Songs written by E-40
Posse cuts
Songs written by Quincy Jones